Ang Mo Kio Town Garden West is a community park that is situated opposite Ang Mo Kio Public Library, along Ang Mo Kio Avenue 6.

The park is popular for recreational activities including jogging and a children's playground, and there is a McDonald's restaurant located at the western side of the park and features a drive-thru facility.

History
The park was the second park to be developed for Ang Mo Kio, and was constructed over a  hill. It was completed in 1983 at a cost of S$2.7 million, and initially featured an observatory terrace, an outdoor stage and play areas for children.

See also
Ang Mo Kio Town Garden East
List of parks in Singapore

References

External links

National Parks Board
 Ang Mo Kio Town Garden West

Gardens in Singapore
Parks in Singapore